The Dance of the Storm is a Chinese television series starring William Chan and Gulnazar. The series started filming on May 5, 2018 at Beijing, and finished filming on October 8, 2018. It premiered on iQiyi, Tencent and Youku on 25 April 2021.

Synopsis
Clark Li Junjie works in MOIS, an information security company where he gets framed and becomes a wanted man after accidentally discovering the company's complicated dealings with external parties. During investigations, he uncovers the truth behind his parents' deaths 16 years ago.

Cast

Main
William Chan as Clark Li Junjie, senior agent in MOIS who returns after leaving suddenly 3 years ago
Gulnazar as Maggie Zhou Zixuan, senior agent in MOIS, Li Junjie's girlfriend

Supporting
Guo Jiahao as Shi Yunhao, senior agent in MOIS, Li Junjie's childhood friend
Cecilia Boey as Chen Jingwen, IT assistant in ARK group, likes Li Junjie
Qin Mingrui as Ma Ya, IT specialist in MOIS
Wang Tonghui as Meng Liang, wanted man who had ties with Li Junjie's parents
Chen Chuhan as Jia Lai, killer working for Ruan Taiyuan
Leo Dong YanLei as A-Gu, killer working for Ruan Taiyuan
Angela Gao Liwen as Hasan, killer
Guo Guangping as Chen Gang, Li Junjie's mentor
Ji Dongran as Deng Zhicheng, agent in MOIS
Candice Zhao Qian as Lin Jin, agent in MOIS
Zhang Bozhi as Xiao Zheng, assistant working for Meng Liang
Zhang Song as Ma Xiaojun, agent in MOIS who likes Ma Ya

Special Appearance
Simon Yam as Mu Chuan, director of MOIS, Zhou Zixuan's foster father
Jiang Wenli as Ruan Taiyuan, internationally wanted criminal
Wu Gang as Ma Qiming, president of ARK group, Shi Yunhao's father
Heidi Wang Ji as Amanda Zheng Peini, inspector from MOIS headquarters
Auguste Kwan as Lin Feng, inspector from MOIS headquarters

Soundtrack

References

Chinese crime television series
Chinese action television series
2021 Chinese television series debuts
Television series by Ciwen Media
Television series by iQiyi Pictures

External links 

 Dance of the Storm on Weibo
 Dance of the Storm on Douban